is a railway station in Hatsukaichi, Hiroshima Prefecture, Japan, operated by West Japan Railway Company (JR West).

Lines
Ōnoura Station is served by the Sanyō Main Line.

Adjacent stations

|-
!colspan=5|JR West

See also

 List of railway stations in Japan

External links

  

Railway stations in Hiroshima Prefecture
Sanyō Main Line
Railway stations in Japan opened in 1919